TBMM TV, or Parliament TV, is a Turkish TV channel which broadcasts discussions held in the Grand National Assembly of Turkey; the channel shares frequencies with TRT 3.

History 

TBMM TV first started broadcasts on 10 December 1994. Its operations are stated as follows in Article 21 of the Turkish Radio and Television Law.

TBMM TV broadcasts live meetings of the Grand National Assembly on Tuesdays, Wednesdays and Thursdays, between 14:00 and 19:00.

Alleged censorship 

TRT is not allowed to censor any dialogue on TBMM TV and blackouts during speeches by opposition parliamentarians have generally been attributed to technical failure.

Various sources have stated that the group meeting of the Republican People's Party (CHP) was not broadcast live on 22 November 2016. TBMM TV officials attributed that this was "due to reasons beyond our control."

On 2 October 2019, the channel reportedly cut off after CHP leader Kemal Kılıçdaroğlu began giving a speech at a CHP group meeting. A statement from TBMM TV said that the broadcast was not interrupted and that TBMM TV switched to another broadcast as required by law.

References 

TBMM TV
TBMM TV
Turkish-language television stations
Television channels and stations established in 1994
1994 establishments in Turkey